Somporn Juangroongruangkit (born 1950/1951) is a Thai businesswoman and the president and CEO of Thai Summit Group, the family-owned and largest car parts manufacturer in Thailand. Her family also owns part of Matichon, a media group.

Personal life
Somporn was married to Pattana Juangroongruangkit, until his death in 2002. They had five children together including Thanathorn Juangroongruangkit, founder of the Future Forward Party.

Career
She has managed the Thai Summit Group since her husband died in 2002.

In 2004, she created the Pattana Golf Club and Resort in Thailand, in memory of her late husband, a keen golfer.

References

Living people
1950s births
Somporn Juangroongruangkit
Somporn Juangroongruangkit